Fältmarskalk Carl Gustaf Wrangel (also Carl Gustav von Wrangel; 23 December 1613 – 5 July 1676) was a Swedish Statesman and Military Commander who commanded the Swedish forces in the Thirty Years' War, as well as the Torstenson, Bremen, Second Northern and Scanian Wars.

A Baltic German, he held the ranks of a Field Marshal, Commander-in-Chief of the Swedish forces in Germany (1646–1648), and Lord High Admiral of Sweden (from 1657). Wrangel was Governor-General of Swedish Pomerania (1648–1652 and 1656–1676) and, from 1664, Lord High Constable of Sweden and a member of the Privy Council. He held the title of a Count of Salmis until 1665, when he became Count of Sölvesborg. By 1673, Wrangel's title was "Count of Sölvesborg, Freiherr of Lindeberg and Ludenhof, Lord of Skokloster, Bremervörde, Wrangelsburg, Spyker, Rappin, Ekebyhov, Gripenberg and Rostorp".

From 1658, Wrangel was Supreme judge in Uppland, and in 1660, he became Chancellor of the University of Greifswald. He held several estates, primarily in the Dominions of Sweden, where he constructed representative mansions: Wrangelsburg, in Pomerania, still bears his name.

Wrangel is part of the Wrangel family and was a close friend of King Charles X Gustav of Sweden.

Family
He was born near Uppsala to Baroness Margareta Grip av Vinäs and Herman Wrangel on 23 December 1613. By paternal descent, he was a member of the Wrangel family of Baltic German origin, branches of which settled in Sweden, Russia and Germany.

Wrangel married Anna Margareta von Haugwitz (died 20 March 1673), who bore him eleven children, six of whom died very young. These five children reached adulthood:
Carl Philipp Wrangel (died 13 April 1668 in London)
Margareta Juliana Wrangel (born 4 November 1642 during the siege of Leipzig, married to Nils Brahe the Younger, nephew of Per Brahe the Younger, on 21 December 1660)
Polidora Christiana Wrangel (born 6 November 1655 in Spyker, married to Leonard Johan Wirtenberg von Debern, son of Arvid Wittenberg, in the summer of 1673)
Eleonora Sophia Wrangel (born 31 August 1651 in Wolgast, married to Ernst Ludwig Freiherr von Putbus on 7 April 1678)
Augusta Aurora Wrangel (born 15 January 1658 in just conquered Frederiksodde, died unmarried and without issue on 27 January 1699)

Under Queen Christina
At the age of 20, he distinguished himself as a cavalry captain in the Thirty Years' War. Three years later, he became colonel, and in 1638, he became major-general, still serving in Germany. In 1644, during the Torstenson War, he commanded a fleet at sea that defeated the Danes at Fehmarn on 23 October.

In 1646, he returned to Germany as a Field Marshal and succeeded Lennart Torstenson as Commander-in-chief of the Swedish army in Germany. Under Wrangel and Turenne, the allied Swedish and French Armies marched and fought in Bavaria and Württemberg. After the end of the Thirty Years' War in 1648, he was made Governor-General of Swedish Pomerania. Queen Christina of Sweden created him count of Salmis in Kexholms län (Salmi and Suistamo pogosta, Käkisalmi province) in northern Karelia, Finland, and he later augmented his lands with Barony of Lindeberg, in Halland.

Under King Charles X Gustav
Before Christina's abdication, Wrangel was already a close friend and trusted advisor of her successor, King Charles X Gustav of Sweden. Wrangel and Charles X Gustav had first met two weeks before the Battle of Leipzig (1642), and when Wrangel's oldest daughter was born during the siege, Charles X Gustav became her godparent. Charles X Gustav created Wrangel freiherr of Ludenhof and Lord High Admiral, a special favour since Charles X Gustav left most of Sweden's highest offices vacant.

When the Second Northern War broke out in 1655, Wrangel commanded a fleet, but in 1656, he was serving on land again and commanding, along with "Great Elector" Frederick William I of Brandenburg in the three-day Battle of Warsaw (1656). In 1657, he invaded Jutland, and in 1658, he passed over the ice into the islands and took Kronborg.

When Charles X Gustav died at the end of the war, Wrangel participated in organising the obsequies and composed the melody to a lament. Also in 1660, Wrangel became chancellor of the University of Greifswald; he had been made supreme judge in Uppland Province two years earlier.

Under King Charles XI
In 1664, he was appointed Lord High Constable of the Realm, and as such, he was a member of the Privy Council during the minority of King Charles XI of Sweden. During the Wars for Bremen, he tried to win the city of Bremen for the Swedish crown but was not successful. On 15 November 1666, he was forced to make peace and concluded the Peace of Habenhausen. During the Scanian War, Wrangel commanded ineffectively because of his broken health and was recalled after his stepbrother, Baron Waldemar Wrangel (1647–1676), had been defeated at Fehrbellin during the Swedish invasion of Brandenburg.

Illness and death
The hardships and injuries that Wrangel suffered during his multiple campaigns, combined with unhealthy eating habits, led to Wrangel suffering from several acute and chronic illnesses for most of his life, most notably gout and gallstone. He was treated at several health resorts, including Spa in August 1651, Langenschwalbach in July 1662 and Pyrmont in the summer of 1668 but without ever completely recovering. In 1674, he broke down "like dead" from two strikes of hypervolemia, and his chronic diseases made it nearly impossible for him to fulfill the tasks of commanding the Swedish forces in the Scanian War.

Shortly afterwards, on 25 June (OS) or 5 July (NS) 1676, Wrangel died in his Spyker Castle on Rügen, Swedish Pomerania (also spelled Spycker, now part of Glowe Municipality). His body was transferred to Stralsund and remained there throughout the siege of 1678. After the battle, Stralsund fell into Danish and Brandenburgian hands, but the Danish king and the Brandenburgian elector, upon requests of Wrangel's heirs, permitted the body to be transferred to Stockholm, which happened in July 1680. On 1 December 1680, he was buried in the Wrangel family's crypt in Skokloster. His preserved written legacy is archived in the Gamla Riksarkivet (Great Imperial Archive), Stockholm.

Landowner and builder
In Swedish Pomerania, Wrangel advanced to become the greatest landowner and held the domains of Spyker (Rügen) with Baldereck, Cape Arkona, Klein Jasmund (now part of Dubnitz, Sassnitz), Koosdorf, Polkvitz, Ruschvitz, Streu and Wostevitz, the former property of the Roskilde bishop, centred on Ralswiek (Rügen), Wrangelsburg with Krebsow, Spandowerhagen and Zarnitz, Groß Ernsthof, Pritzier with Buddenhagen, Giesekenhagen, Hohendorf, Hohensee, Katzow, Netzeband and Zarnow, Nonnendorf with Latzow, Lubmin and Vierow, Mölschow (Usedom) with Bannemin, Mahlzow, Sauzin, Zecherin and Ziemitz, Brüssow and Krummin (Usedom), and also the islands Greifswalder Oie and Ruden. Wrangel's Amt Saatzig, in Farther Pomerania, was exchanged for the already-mentioned Klein Jasmund, Polkvitz, Rushvitz and Wostevitz in 1653, when Farther Pomerania fell to Brandenburg.

In Swedish Livonia, Wrangel held the domains of Ödenpäh, Rappin and Wrangelshof, with Ödenpäh and Wrangelshof being exchanged for Pomeranian domains in 1653. Also in Livonia, he held Luua (then Ludenhof or Luhde castle in Walk (Valga) county). In Scania he held Lillö. Near Stockholm, he held Ekebyhov, and in Karelia, he held Salmis county, which he exchanged for Sölvesborg County in Blekinge in 1665. In Finland, he held property in Bjärnå as well as in Skokloster in Uppland, and Rostorp and Säby in Småland. In Halland, Wrangel held the county of Lindeberg. In Bremen-Verden, he held Amt Bremervörde.

Wrangel built Gripenberg Palace in Säby, and palaces in Bremervörde, Skokloster, Spyker, Stralsund, Wrangelsburg. Wrangelsburg bears his name since it was renamed by him from "Vorwerk" on 19 September 1653. His favourite and grandest castle was Skokloster Castle, in Uppland, in which he created substantial collections of art and expensive weapons and exotic items.

Notes

References

Sources

External links

1613 births
1676 deaths
People from Uppsala
Field marshals of Sweden
Members of the Privy Council of Sweden
17th-century Swedish nobility
Baltic-German people
Swedish Pomerania
17th-century Swedish military personnel
17th-century Swedish politicians
Carl Gustaf
Swedish people of the Thirty Years' War
Military personnel of the Thirty Years' War